Monika Estere Štube (born 15 September 1999) is a Latvian footballer who plays as a midfielder for FA Women's National League Division One North club Bradford City. She has previously played for Sieviešu Futbola Līga club Talsu NSS and the Latvia women's national team.

Club career

While living in West Yorkshire, England, Štube has represented Leeds United, Guiseley Vixens and Bradford City.

International career

In September 2021, incoming national team coach Romāns Kvačovs invited Štube to his first training camp. She turned down the call-up for personal reasons.

References

1999 births
Living people
Place of birth missing (living people)
Latvian women's footballers
Women's association football midfielders
Bradford City W.F.C. players
Latvia women's youth international footballers
Latvia women's international footballers
Latvian expatriate footballers
Latvian expatriate sportspeople in England
Expatriate women's footballers in England
Leeds City Vixens L.F.C. players
Leeds United Women F.C. players